Acronicta cyanescens is a moth of the family Noctuidae first described by George Hampson in 1909. It is found in western North America, from extreme south-western Alberta west, and south to New Mexico.

The wingspan is 45–47 mm. Adults are on wing from June to July in one generation depending on the location.

References

Acronicta
Moths of North America
Moths described in 1909